Earth's circumference is the distance around Earth.

Measurement of Earth's circumference has been important to navigation since ancient times. The first known scientific measurement and calculation was done by Eratosthenes, who achieved a great degree of precision in his computation. Treating the Earth as a sphere, its circumference would be its single most important measurement. Earth deviates from spherical by about 0.3%, as characterized by flattening.

In modern times, Earth's circumference has been used to define fundamental units of measurement of length: the nautical mile in the seventeenth century and the metre in the eighteenth. Earth's polar circumference is very near to 21,600 nautical miles because the nautical mile was intended to express one  minute of latitude (see meridian arc), which is 21,600 partitions of the polar circumference (that is 60 minutes × 360 degrees). The polar circumference is also close to 40,000 kilometres because the metre was originally defined to be one ten millionth (i.e., a kilometre is one ten thousandth) of the arc from pole to equator (quarter meridian). The accuracy of measuring the circumference has improved since then, but the physical length of each unit of measure had remained close to what it was determined to be at the time, so the Earth's circumference is no longer a round number in metres or nautical miles.

History

Eratosthenes
The measure of Earth's circumference is the most famous among the results obtained by Eratosthenes, who estimated that the meridian has a length of 252,000 stadia, with an error on the real value between −2.4% and +0.8% (assuming a value for the stadion between 155 and 160 metres). Eratosthenes described his technique in a book entitled On the measure of the Earth, which has not been preserved.

Eratosthenes' method to calculate Earth's circumference has been lost; what has been preserved is the simplified version described by Cleomedes to popularise the discovery. Cleomedes invites his reader to consider two Egyptian cities, Alexandria and Syene, modern Assuan:
 Cleomedes assumes that the distance between Syene and Alexandria was 5,000 stadia (a figure that was checked yearly by professional bematists, mensores regii). 
 He assumes the simplified (but inaccurate) hypothesis that Syene was precisely on the Tropic of Cancer, saying that at local noon on the summer solstice the Sun was directly overhead. Syene was actually north of the tropic by something less than a degree.
 He assumes the simplified (but inaccurate) hypothesis that Syene and Alexandria are on the same meridian. Syene was actually about 3 degrees of longitude east of Alexandria.

Under the previous assumptions, writes Cleomedes, you can measure the Sun's angle of elevation at noon of the summer solstice in Alexandria, by using a vertical rod (a gnomon) of known length and measuring the length of its shadow on the ground; it is then possible to calculate the angle of the Sun's rays, which he claims to be about 7°, or 1/50th the circumference of a circle. Taking the Earth as spherical, the Earth's circumference would be fifty times the distance between Alexandria and Syene, that is 250,000 stadia. Since 1 Egyptian stadion is equal to about 157.7 metres, the result is roughly 39,425 km, which is 1.5% less than the real circumference, 40,008 km.

Eratosthenes' method was actually more complicated, as stated by the same Cleomedes, whose purpose was to present a simplified version of the one described in Eratosthenes' book. The method was based on several surveying trips conducted by professional bematists, whose job was to precisely measure the extent of the territory of Egypt for agricultural and taxation-related purposes. Furthermore, the fact that Eratosthenes' measure corresponds precisely to 252,000 stadia might be intentional, since it is a number that can be divided by all natural numbers from 1 to 10: some historians believe that Eratosthenes changed from the 250,000 value written by Cleomedes to this new value to simplify calculations; other historians of science, on the other side, believe that Eratosthenes introduced a new length unit based on the length of the meridian, as stated by Pliny, who writes about the stadion "according to Eratosthenes' ratio".

Posidonius

Posidonius calculated the Earth's circumference by reference to the position of the star Canopus. As explained by Cleomedes, Posidonius observed Canopus on but never above the horizon at Rhodes, while at Alexandria he saw it ascend as far as  degrees above the horizon (the meridian arc between the latitude of the two locales is actually 5 degrees 14 minutes). Since he thought Rhodes was 5,000 stadia due north of Alexandria, and the difference in the star's elevation indicated the distance between the two locales was 1/48 of the circle, he multiplied 5,000 by 48 to arrive at a figure of 240,000 stadia for the circumference of the earth. It is generally thought that the stadion used by Posidonius was almost exactly 1/10 of a modern statute mile. Pliny the Elder mentions Posidonius among his sources and without naming him reported his method for estimating the Earth's circumference. He noted, however, that Hipparchus had added some 26,000 stadia to Eratosthenes's estimate. The smaller value offered by Strabo and the different lengths of Greek and Roman stadia have created a persistent confusion around Posidonius's result. Ptolemy used Posidonius's lower value of 180,000 stades (about 33% too low) for the earth's circumference in his Geography. This was the number used by Christopher Columbus in order to underestimate the distance to India as 70,000 stades.

Aryabhata
Around AD 525, the Indian mathematician and astronomer Aryabhata wrote Aryabhatiya, in which he calculated the diameter of earth to be of 1,050 yojanas. The length of the yojana intended by Aryabhata is in dispute. Another gives , too large by 20%. Yet another gives , too large by 5%.

Islamic Golden Age
Around AD 830, Caliph Al-Ma'mun commissioned a group of Muslim astronomers led by Al-Khwarizmi to measure the distance from Tadmur (Palmyra) to Raqqa, in modern Syria. They calculated the Earth's circumference to be within 15% of the modern value, and possibly much closer. How accurate it actually was is not known because of uncertainty in the conversion between the medieval Arabic units and modern units, but in any case, technical limitations of the methods and tools would not permit an accuracy better than about 5%.

A more convenient way to estimate was provided in Al-Biruni's Codex Masudicus (1037). In contrast to his predecessors, who measured the Earth's circumference by sighting the Sun simultaneously from two locations, al-Biruni developed a new method of using trigonometric calculations, based on the angle between a plain and mountain top, which made it possible for it to be measured by a single person from a single location. From the top of the mountain, he sighted the dip angle which, along with the mountain's height (which he determined beforehand), he applied to the law of sines formula. This was the earliest known use of dip angle and the earliest practical use of the law of sines. However, the method could not provide more accurate results than previous methods, due to technical limitations, and so al-Biruni accepted the value calculated the previous century by the al-Ma'mun expedition.

Columbus's error
1,700 years after Eratosthenes's death, Christopher Columbus studied what Eratosthenes had written about the size of the Earth. Nevertheless, based on a map by Toscanelli, he chose to believe that the Earth's circumference was 25% smaller. If, instead, Columbus had accepted Eratosthenes's larger value, he would have known that the place where he made landfall was not Asia, but rather a New World.

Historical use in the definition of units of measurement

In 1617 the Dutch scientist Willebrord Snellius assessed the circumference of the Earth at 24,630 Roman miles (24,024 statute miles). Around that time British mathematician Edmund Gunter improved navigational tools including a new quadrant to determine latitude at sea. He reasoned that the lines of latitude could be used as the basis for a unit of measurement for distance and proposed the nautical mile as one minute or one-sixtieth of one degree of latitude. Gunter used Snellius's circumference to define a nautical mile as 6,080 feet, the length of one minute of arc at 48 degrees latitude.

In 1793, France defined the metre so as to make the polar circumference of the Earth 40,000 kilometres.  In order to measure this distance accurately, the French Academy of Sciences commissioned Jean Baptiste Joseph Delambre and Pierre Méchain to lead an expedition to attempt to accurately measure the distance between a belfry in Dunkerque and Montjuïc castle in Barcelona to estimate the length of the meridian arc through Dunkerque. The length of the first prototype metre bar was based on these measurements, but it was later determined that its length was short by about 0.2 millimetres because of miscalculation of the flattening of the Earth, making the prototype about 0.02% shorter than the original proposed definition of the metre. Regardless, this length became the French standard and was progressively adopted by other countries in Europe. This is why the polar circumference of the Earth is actually 40,008 kilometres, instead of 40,000.

See also
 Earth radius
 Spherical Earth
 Nautical mile

References

Bibliography

External links
 Carl Sagan demonstrates how Eratosthenes determined that the Earth was round and the approximate circumference

Circumference
Units of length
Geodesy